
Gmina Olecko is an urban-rural gmina (administrative district) in Olecko County, Warmian-Masurian Voivodeship, in northern Poland.

Villages
Apart from the town of Olecko, Gmina Olecko contains the villages and settlements of Babki Gąseckie, Babki Oleckie, Biała Olecka, Borawskie, Borawskie Małe, Dąbrowskie, Dąbrowskie-Osiedle, Dobki, Doliwy, Duły, Gąski, Giże, Gordejki, Gordejki Małe, Imionki, Imionki PKP, Jaśki, Judziki, Kijewo, Kolonia Olecko, Kukowo, Łęgowo, Lenarty, Lipkowo, Możne, Olszewo, Pieńki, Plewki, Przytuły, Raczki Wielkie, Rosochackie, Sedranki, Skowronki, Ślepie, Świdry, Szczecinki, Wólka Kijewska, Zabielne, Zajdy, Zatyki and Zielonówek.

Neighbouring gminas
Gmina Olecko is bordered by the gminas of Bakałarzewo, Ełk, Filipów, Kalinowo, Kowale Oleckie, Świętajno and Wieliczki.

References
Polish official population figures 2006

Olecko
Olecko County